Ligonier Historic District is a national historic district located at Ligonier, Westmoreland County, Pennsylvania. It encompasses 419 contributing buildings, 2 contributing sites, 1 contributing structure, and 1 contributing object in the central business district and surrounding residential areas of Ligonier.  They were built between about 1790 and 1944, and includes a mix of residential, commercial, institutional, and industrial properties. They are in a variety of popular architectural styles including Federal and Late Victorian. Notable buildings include the E.T. Weller House (1907), Ligonier Valley Railroad Station (1909), United Presbyterian (Pioneer) Church (1876), Covenant Presbyterian Church (1902), Heritage United Methodist Church (1903), and the former Municipal Building (1937).  The district includes the separately listed Fort Ligonier Site and demolished Ligonier Armory.

It was added to the National Register of Historic Places in 1994.

Gallery

References

Historic districts on the National Register of Historic Places in Pennsylvania
Federal architecture in Pennsylvania
Historic districts in Westmoreland County, Pennsylvania
National Register of Historic Places in Westmoreland County, Pennsylvania